Pangora distorta is a moth of the family Erebidae first described by Frederic Moore in 1879. It is found in the north-western Himalayas and Nepal.

References

Moths described in 1879
Spilosomina